Lesbian, gay, bisexual, and transgender (LGBT) people in  Estonia may face legal challenges not experienced by non-LGBT residents. Both male and female same-sex sexual activity are legal in Estonia. Since 1 January 2016, same-sex couples may register their relationship as a cohabitation agreement, which gives them almost all the same legal protections available to opposite-sex couples. Nevertheless, same-sex couples are unable to marry or jointly adopt.

Among the countries which after World War II were controlled by the former Soviet Union's communist regime, independent Estonia is now considered to be one the most liberal when it comes to LGBT rights. Acceptance of LGBT people has grown significantly since the early 21st century, though there is a notable age gap, as younger people tend to be more tolerant and liberal, while older people tend to be more socially conservative. According to ILGA-Europe, Estonia ranks 21st in Europe on LGBT rights legislation. This is lower than for neighbouring Finland or Sweden, but higher than Latvia, and significantly higher than Russia. A 2017 opinion survey found 58% of the Estonian population supported an anti-discrimination law covering LGBT people, whilst 45% supported civil partnerships for same-sex couples.

Law regarding same-sex sexual activity
Same-sex sexual activity between consenting males, which until 1917 had been illegal in the former Russian Empire, was formally legalised in the newly independent Republic of Estonia when the country's parliament approved changes in the criminal code in 1929, and when new code came into force in 1935.  Before the adoption of the new criminal law, the criminal and correctional penal code of Imperial Russia was observed.

In 1940, Estonia was occupied and annexed by the Soviet Union. Same-sex sexual activity between males was a criminal offense during the Soviet occupations (1940–1941, 1944–1991); it was legalized in Estonia in 1992. In 2002, the age of consent was set at 14 years and equalized for both homosexual and heterosexual sex. In 2022, the age of consent was raised to 16 years.

Recognition of same-sex relationships

Cohabitation agreements
In March 2014, a parliamentary group began to work on a draft bill to regulate the legal status of cohabiting couples. The draft bill was submitted to the Parliament (Riigikogu) on 17 April 2014. On 22 May, the bill was backed by the Government. On 19 June 2014, the Parliament rejected a motion to kill the bill, in a 32–45 vote. The bill's second reading took place on 8 October where a motion to hold a referendum on the issue was defeated in a 35–42 vote and another motion to kill the bill was defeated in a 41–33 vote. The bill's final vote took place on 9 October, where it was passed 40–38. It was signed into law by President Toomas Hendrik Ilves that same day, becoming the Registered Partnership Act, and took effect on 1 January 2016. The campaign against the law was led by the Christian conservative foundation For Family and Tradition.

However, some implementing acts required for the law to enter into force have yet to be passed. On 26 November 2015, Parliament approved the first implementing acts on a vote of 42–41 with several abstentions, though nothing has happened since. In February 2017, the Tallinn Administrative Court ordered the Estonian Government to pay monetary damages for failing to adopt the implementing acts. In September 2017, President Kersti Kaljulaid criticised the Parliament for failing to accept the implementing acts.

Recognition of same-sex marriages performed abroad
A same-sex marriage was recognised by a court in December 2016. The couple, two men who had originally married in Sweden but now live in Estonia, had their marriage officially registered in late January 2017. Initially, a court in Harju County refused to register their marriage, but the couple appealed the decision. In December, the Tallinn Circuit Court ruled that the marriage must be entered into the Estonian population register.

Adoption and family law
Single gay, lesbian and bisexual people may petition to adopt and same-sex couples are allowed to foster. Same-sex couples cannot adopt jointly because Estonian law states that only a married couple can do so.

However, due to the Registered Partnership Act, couples are allowed to adopt stepchildren. In February 2017, the Tallinn Administrative Court allowed a lesbian woman to adopt her partner's children. There have been other cases of same-sex couples successfully adopting. Additionally, lesbian couples have access to IVF.

Discrimination protections
As an obligation for acceptance into the European Union, Estonia transposed an EU directive into its own laws banning discrimination based on sexual orientation in employment from 1 May 2004. The Law on Equal Treatment, which entered into force on 1 January 2009, also prohibits discrimination on the basis of sexual orientation in areas other than employment, such as health care, social security, education and the provision of goods and services. Section 2 of the law states as follows:

Since 2006, the Penal Code has prohibited public incitement to hatred on the basis of sexual orientation.

Gender identity and expression
Since June 2002, transgender people in Estonia have been allowed to change their legal gender and name. Additionally, they are not required to undergo sex reassignment surgery, sterilisation or divorce their partner.

Military service

Gays, lesbians and bisexuals are allowed to serve openly in the military.

Living conditions

Discrimination and prejudice against LGBT persons remains a significant problem in several parts of the Estonian society. Although male homosexuality was illegal until the end of the Soviet occupation in 1991, already in the mid-1980s, there was an unofficial gay bar in Tallinn. There was also at least one cruising area in both Tallinn and Tartu, though outside of these two cities, the gay scene was invisible. The first conference dedicated to sexual minorities took place in Tallinn in 1990. At the same time, the Estonian Lesbian Society (Eesti Lesbiliit) was founded.

Annual Pride parades have been organised in Tallinn since 2004. In an incident in 2007, some of the parade's participants were verbally and physically attacked by anti-gay protesters. After the 2007 violent anti-gay attacks, no Tallinn Pride parade took place until 2017. Some 1,800 people attended the event in 2017. The pride parade also received the backing of numerous foreign embassies, including the American, British, French, German, Latvian and Lithuanian embassies, among many others.

In June 2006, Dutch Ambassador to Estonia Hans Glaubitz requested he be transferred to the Dutch consulate in Canada, after he had reportedly been suffering from repeated homophobic and racial verbal abuse being hurled by some locals in Tallinn against his partner, an Afro-Cuban dancer Raúl García Lao. A statement subsequently released by the Estonian authorities stated that they "regretted the incidents very much".

In June 2011, Estonia hosted the Baltic Pride. Key speakers at the event included Riho Rahuoja, the Deputy Secretary General for Social Policy at the Ministry of Social Affairs; Christian Veske, the Chief Specialist in the Ministry's Gender Equality Department; Kari Käsper, Project Manager of the "Diversity Enriches" campaign from the Estonian Human Rights Centre; Hanna Kannelmäe from the Estonian Gay Youth NGO; U.S. Ambassador to Estonia Michael C. Polt; British Ambassador to Estonia Peter Carter and British photographer Clare B. Dimyon, who exhibited "Proud of our Identity" at Tallinn's Solaris Centre on 31 March. "Proud of our Identity" comprises photographs of and by lesbian, gay, bisexual and transgender people taken at various Pride events throughout Europe, including photographs of Estonian LGBT people. Tallinn hosted the event again in 2014 and 2017.

In February 2019, LGBT association "SevenBow", the organizers of the Festheart LGBTI film festival, sued the Rakvere City Council for cutting its funding by 80%. The city's Cultural Affairs Committee initially endorsed the group's funding applications, but the City Council cut its funding to just a fifth of the applied sum. Lawyers argued that anti-gay views motivated the cutback. In May 2019, an administrative court ruled that the council's decision to provide less funding was unlawful, and ruled that it had no justification to give a smaller grant to SevenBow. The court added that the council had also not raised an appropriate legal basis which would have allowed it to deviate from the decision drawn up by the Cultural Affairs Committee.

Public opinion

According to a survey conducted in 2000, 50% of surveyed men and 63% of women agreed with the statement "Homosexuality among adults is a private affair of the people concerned with which officials of the law should in no way interfere"; 29% of men and 25% of women found it hard to say what their position was.

A Eurobarometer survey published in December 2006 showed that 21% of Estonians surveyed supported same-sex marriage and 14% supported the right of same-sex couples to adopt (EU-wide average: 44% and 33%, respectively).

According to a Eurobarometer survey published in 2008, only 13 percent of Estonians professed to have homosexual friends or acquaintances, compared to a 34 percent average in the EU. However, Estonians ranked higher than the European average in willingness to grant equal opportunities to sexual minorities.

A poll conducted in June 2009 showed that 32% of Estonians believed that same-sex couples should have the same legal rights as opposite-sex couples. Support was 40% among young people, but only 6% among older people.

A poll conducted in September 2012 found that 34% of Estonians supported same-sex marriage and 46% supported registered partnerships (in contrast to 60% and 45% that shared the opposing stance respectively). The poll found an ethnic divide: while 51% of ethnic Estonians supported registered partnerships, only 21% of ethnic Russians were of the same view.

The same poll conducted in 2014 during the parliamentary debate on registered partnership revealed that the support dropped significantly with only 29% and 40% of respondents supporting same-sex marriage and registered partnership legislation respectively, and the level of opposition on both issues had increased to 64% and 54%.

The 2015 Eurobarometer survey showed that 44% of Estonians supported gay, lesbian and bisexual people having the same equal rights as heterosexuals, while 45% were opposed. 40% of Estonians believed there is nothing wrong with homosexual relationships and 49% disagreed, while 31% of Estonians supported same-sex marriage and 58% were against.

A poll conducted between 28 March 2017 to 10 April 2017 found that, while support for same-sex registered partnership legislation was unchanged in three years (45% vs 46%), support for same-sex marriages had increased to 39% with 52% against (compared to 60% against in 2012 and 64% against in 2014). It also found that acceptance of homosexuality had increased from 34% in 2012 to 41% in 2017, with 52% against. At the same time, support for joint adoption rights remained unchanged with 66% opposing such legislation.

A public opinion survey conducted in 2019 showed that 49% of Estonians supported same-sex registered partnerships and 39% opposed.

The 2019 Eurobarometer found that 41% of Estonians thought same-sex marriage should be allowed throughout Europe; 51% were against.

Summary table

See also

Human rights in Estonia
LGBT rights in Europe
LGBT rights in the European Union

References

 
1992 in law
Sexuality in Estonia